The Irish News is a compact daily newspaper based in Belfast, Northern Ireland. It is Northern Ireland's largest selling morning newspaper and is available throughout Ireland. It is broadly Irish nationalist in its viewpoint, though it also features unionist columnists.

History
The Irish News is the only independently owned daily newspaper based in Northern Ireland, and has been so since its launch on 15 August 1891 as an anti-Parnell newspaper by Patrick MacAlister. It merged with the Belfast Morning News in August 1892, and the full title of the paper has since been The Irish News and Belfast Morning News. T.P. Campbell was editor from 1895 until 1906 when he was succeeded by Tim McCarthy who served as editor until 1928. Appointed in 1999, Noel Doran is the current editor.

The Irish News saw a dramatic growth in its circulation with the beginning of The Troubles in 1969; this peaked around the time of the peak in violence in 1971, and declined thereafter.

In June 1982 the paper came under the control of the company's present owners.

Circulation

References

External links

 The Irish News online

Daily newspapers published in the United Kingdom
Grade B1 listed buildings
Mass media in Belfast
Newspapers published in Northern Ireland
Publications established in 1891